Telectronics Pty Ltd was an Australian company best known for its role in developing the pacemaker. It was located in Lane Cove, Sydney. In 1988 the business was acquired by Pacific Dunlop. However, legal claims resulting from the sale of faulty pacemaker electrode leads inherited by the company in acquisition of Cordis Corporation of Miami led to eventual sale of the assets of the company and Pacific Dunlop restructuring itself into Ansell.

Development of the pacemaker
Telectronics Pty Limited was incorporated in Sydney, Australia, in 1963   by technician and initial financier Noel Gray and engineer Geoffrey Wickham initially designing and manufacturing industrial and scientific instruments but diversifying into medical electronics and commencing cardiac pacemaker research in 1964. The corporate name was derived from "Television and Electronic Services", operated by Noel Gray as a sole trader from 1959 to 1964.
 
 The company made significant contributions to pacemaker technology including the first definition of the relationship between surface area of the heart electrodes & pacing pulse characteristics, the first use of integrated circuits and the first hermetic titanium encapsulation. 

The company's first model, designated P1, was implanted in three volunteer terminally ill patients in December '64 - January'65, while 2 control samples were retained in a 37 °C. saline bath. This initial design used PNP - NPN electronics to deliver a 2.0 millisecond pulse to the Jeffcoat epicardial electrodes, and was powered by 4 Mallory mercuric oxide-zinc cells (mercury battery), all encapsulated in epoxy resin with a final dip coat of a mix of epoxy and titanium dioxide. All 3 implants failed in ability to maintain capture of the heart after periods of up to 35 weeks. These failures were later proven to be due to the excessively large surface area of the electrodes.

The initial clinical experience led to further animal research using mongrel dogs at the laboratories of the University of Sydney medical school and at the Royal North Shore Hospital's Wellcome laboratory. In this research measurements were made of electrode impedance and pacing threshold energy over a range of pulse voltages and pulse widths, using intramyocardial electrodes of 10, 20 & 50 square millimeters surface area. The chronic measurements allowed plotting of the relationship between electrode surface area and pulse voltage/width, leading to a conclusion that an electrode area between 10 & 30 mm2 was optimum in terms of energy needed when combined with a pulse width of only 0.5 milliseconds.

These characteristics were incorporated in the next design to be implanted in humans, the model P4, which employed 30 mm2 area intramyocardial electrodes (and later transvenous pacing electrodes), a very conservative 7.5 volt pulse and for further conservatism a magnetically operated switch which could be actuated from outside the body to change the pulse width from 0.5 to 1.0 millisecond. The 0.5 millisecond pulse width became the standard for later Telectronics models and became the approximate standard for all pacemaker manufacturers by the late 70's, until the evolution of externally programmable/monitorable pacemakers using digital electronics in the late 1980s. 

Research also included dissection and analysis of the failure modes of explanted pacemakers of any manufacturer. Most failures were due to an internal short circuit of one of the cells of the multicell battery due to the growth of metallic  dendrites; or the result of water vapour diffusing though the epoxy resin encapsulation. The only suitable cell available at the time was the mercuric oxide-zinc cell, so the battery problems remained. In 1967 Telectronics commenced research into the technologies which could allow hermetic sealing of the pacemaker to preclude water vapour penetration and, as an interim measure contracted AWM a subsidiary of Amalgamated Wireless Australia Limited (AWA) to develop integrated circuits for the electronics.  These early integrated circuits were developed by David R Money who later joined Telectronics and later still led development of the cochlear implant for the profoundly deaf. The circuits were analogue type, housed in hermetically sealed ceramic military 'flat packs' with redundant double gold bonding of the terminations. The IC's were first used in the model P7 of 1969. 

The first hermetically sealed models were the P8-9-10 of 1971 using titanium encapsulation with ceramic terminal insulation, developed by David J Cowdery. Bonding of the ceramic was performed using vacuum brazing and an alloy of titanium/nickel with a small percentage of copper. The final hermetic sealing of the titanium capsule was performed by a TIG  argon welding process within a large bell jar on an automated analogue controlled machine designed and built by Cowdery. These were the first pacemakers using the conventional battery to be hermetically sealed. Gas products of the battery were absorbed by a chemical 'getter'. Some examples of these models survived to beyond 5 years. By the late 80's TIG welding was replaced by laser welding.

In 1971 Telectronics commenced testing samples of a new type of energy source for pacemakers, the lithium cell (lithium battery) being developed by Wilson Greatbatch and in 1972 commenced development of a range of integrated circuits capable of operation from the 2.8 volts of the cell while providing a stimulating pulse of 4.5 volts. The combined technologies of a lithium cell, integrated circuits, hermetic titanium casing and an 0.5 millisecond pulse was first used clinically in 1974 in the model 120 pacemaker which was state of the art for that time. In 1981 a study of 28,669 Telectronics lithium powered implants showed a cumulative survival of 99.88% and a MTTF of 12,260 months. The longest surviving model 120 was electively explanted in 1993 after 17 years of operation.

Control of Telectronics was gained in 1967 by Nucleus Holdings. Telectronics Inc. was incorporated in the US in 1974, and in 1977 commenced US manufacture from the former General Electric facility in Milwaukee, later relocating to Denver. A manufacturing plant was also established at Châtellerault France, in 1978.

Pacific Dunlop

In 1988 Nucleus Limited was acquired by Pacific Dunlop.  At that time Nucleus Limited contained offshoots such as Telectronics, Medtel, Ausonics, Domedica and Cochlear Pty Ltd.  Cochlear Limited which developed the cochlear implant was floated on the Australian stock market.  Pacific Dunlop was hoping to diversify away from so-called rustbelt companies. At the time of acquisition, Telectronics was number 2 in the worldwide pacemaker market.

In January 1995, Telectronics was forced to recall thousands of model 801 atrial "J" leads by the Food and Drug Administration leading to the company having to eventually settle legal claims at a cost of hundreds of millions of dollars.  The cause of the recall was a "J lead" electrode, utilizing a rigid stylet within the helix of the electrode lead, inherited by the company in acquisition of pacemaker lead manufacturer Cordis Corporation of Miami. The inherent dangers arising from incorporation of a rigid stylet had been demonstrated by Telectronics, Sydney, in 1967.
In 1996 Pacific Dunlop sold most of the assets of Telectronics Limited to St Jude Medical of Minnesota and Telectronics Pty Limited is now a shelf company TPLC Pty. Ltd. Pacific Dunlop restructured in 2001 becoming Ansell with the high cost of the Telectronics settlement being a contributing factor in the decision.

References

Defunct manufacturing companies of Australia
Electronics companies of Australia
Australian companies established in 1963